Giuliano Galoppo (born 18 June 1999) is an Argentine professional footballer who plays as a midfielder for Campeonato Brasileiro Série A club São Paulo.

Club career

Banfield
Galoppo joined Boca Juniors' youth ranks in 2014, either side of stints with Atlético de Rafaela. He had previously trained with clubs in Italy due to his father playing in the country. In 2016, Galoppo joined Banfield. He was moved into the club's first-team during the 2017–18 Primera División season, subsequently being an unused substitute on six occasions across Primera División, Copa Argentina and Copa Sudamericana matches before making his bow. In November 2018, Galoppo made his professional debut during a Primera División draw away to Racing Club; Julio César Falcioni substituted him on after seventy-eight minutes for Luciano Gómez.

His first start came in the succeeding March against Defensa y Justicia, which preceded him featuring four times off the bench in 2019–20. Galoppo then scored five goals in twelve appearances, one in each of the club's five away games, in the 2020 Copa de la Liga Profesional as they reached the final; where they'd lose out to his ex-club Boca Juniors. During the subsequent 2021 edition, the midfielder scored on matchday one at home to Racing Club before netting a brace on matchday two away against Arsenal de Sarandí.

São Paulo
On 26 July 2022, Galoppo joined Campeonato Brasileiro Série A club São Paulo, signing a contract until June 2027.

International career
In February 2018, Galoppo was selected to train with the Argentina U19s.

Career statistics
.

Personal life
Galoppo is the son of former professional footballer Marcelino Galoppo.

References

External links

1999 births
Living people
Footballers from Buenos Aires
Argentine people of Italian descent
Argentine footballers
Argentine Primera División players
Campeonato Brasileiro Série A players
Association football midfielders
Club Atlético Banfield footballers
São Paulo FC players
Argentine expatriate footballers
Argentine expatriate sportspeople in Brazil
Expatriate footballers in Brazil